Summerlee Museum of Scottish Industrial Life is an industrial and social history museum in Coatbridge, North Lanarkshire, Scotland. It is situated on the site of the Victorian Summerlee Iron Works and  the former Hydrocon Crane factory. The main Hydrocon factory building became the museum’s exhibition hall but it has been substantially changed and adapted since.  The museum aims to show Lanarkshire's contribution to engineering, mining, steel working, weaving and farming, and also show the lives of the people of the area. It includes interactive displays and a temporary exhibition space. Entry is free of charge.

The museum also incorporates several railway steam locomotives, preserved railway carriages from a 1960s-era Glasgow Class 311 and has a short working heritage tram line.

The museum covers 22 acres and includes two scheduled monuments, Summerlee Iron Works and the Monkland Canal, a large play area, mine and miners' row, outdoor exhibits, a cafe, changing place, gift shop and sweet shop.

The Miners' Row
Built in 1991-2, the miners' row, or "raw" shows typical workers' homes from the 1880s to the 1980s. In the row there is also a sweet shop selling old fashioned sweets and some of modern houses have gardens such as the 1940s house which has a wartime "dig for victory" garden with Anderson shelter. The row is used frequently as a location for filming.

Summerlee Tramway

The Summerlee Transport Group (STG) was formed in 1988, in order to support the maintenance and operation of the tramway. The original tramway used to terminate only 300 yards from the entrance at the timber shed, before the extension of the Gartsherrie Branch canal bridge and thence towards the Miners' Cottages. As continued tradition, the cars continued to halt at the timber shed before continuing over the bridge and around the bend.

The tramway opened in 1988 and was the first operational tramway in Scotland for over a quarter of a century, following the closure of the Glasgow Corporation Tramway in 1962, and continued to be the only tramway in Scotland for twenty-six years until Edinburgh reopened its tramway in 2014, save from the Glasgow Garden Festival Tramway, which opened six weeks after the Summerlee Line.

Whilst the first two operational trams at Summerlee were continental cars - Brussels 9062 and Graz 225 - it has always been the intention to use traditional British cars, preferably with local connections, which is now being realized.

There were also two donor cars on site, which were never operational, purchased for their spare parts:

Oporto 150 was built in 1925 and remained in service there until 1993, when it was purchased by Summerlee for its truck and electrical equipment for Lanarkshire 53 during its restoration. The body was later scrapped.

Lisbon 400-474 was built in 1900-1901 and worked on the system until 1973. The truck was sold to Summerlee in 1995, re-sized and fitted to Glasgow 1017.

Railway rolling stock

Other transportation
 A replica of the 1819 barge Vulcan, the first all-iron-hulled vessel, built for the Glasgow Garden Festival in 1988. The replica is probably the last hand riveted boat built on the Clyde and was Summerlee Museum and Monklands District Council's entry into the Festival. In 2016, it was re-sited on the Monkland Canal, the Gartsherrie Cut runs through the site, following refurbishment with the aid of Scottish Waterways, Scottish Canals and the Heritage Lottery Fund. It rests on a cradle, slightly proud of the water and is fully accessible for visitors.

See also
Beamish Museum - an industrial museum in the North East of England
Black Country Living Museum - an industrial museum in the West Midlands conurbation
East Anglia Transport Museum - a transport museum in Suffolk
Riverside Museum (Glasgow Museum of Transport)
Titan Clydebank
Scottish Maritime Museum
National Tramway Museum, - located in Crich, Derbyshire
The Trolleybus Museum at Sandtoft
St Fagans National History Museum - Museum of Welsh Life, Cardiff, Wales.

References

External links

Summerlee Museum of Scottish Industrial Life - North Lanarkshire Council's "Summerlee Museum of Scottish Industrial Life" official website
Details from Visit Lanarkshire

Coatbridge
Heritage railways in Scotland
Industry museums in Scotland
Living museums in the United Kingdom
Mining museums in Scotland
Museums in North Lanarkshire
Open-air museums in Scotland
Railway museums in Scotland
Tramways with double-decker trams
Transport museums in Scotland